Frank F. Garcia ( – January 24, 1956) was an American professional basketball player and minor league baseball player. In basketball, Cihlar played in the National Basketball League for the Cleveland Chase Brassmen / Allmen Transfer between 1943 and 1946. In baseball, Garcia played the Butler Yankees (1939) and Leaksville-Draper-Spray Triplets (1946).

References

1910s births
1956 deaths
Year of birth uncertain
American men's basketball players
Basketball players from Akron, Ohio
Butler Yankees players
Cleveland Allmen Transfers players
Cleveland Chase Brassmen players
Forwards (basketball)
Guards (basketball)
Leaksville-Draper-Spray Triplets players